Nokturnl is a band formed in 1996 in Alice Springs, Northern Territory, Australia. Sometimes called rap metal; their music is hard to categorise, but their lyrics are influenced by their experience as Indigenous Australians. Nokturnl won "Band of the Year" at The Deadlys in 1998, 2000 and 2003.

They signed with Festival Mushroom offshoot Sputnik Records in December 1999. Their first release, "Neva Mend", was nominated for ARIA Award  ARIA Award for Best Adult Alternative Album and ARIA Award for Best Video.

They have toured in Europe and in Brazil. They toured Australia with Spiderbait, and have supported Powderfinger and Regurgitator, they have recorded with Spiderbait, Machine Gun Fellatio and Primary, and have performed at the Survival Festival Concert (1998) and Big Day Out (2000). On 3 July 2000 they performed a live set for TripleJ's Live at the Wireless. Channel V aired an hour-long documentary on 16 October 2000 featuring live footage shot on 28 July 2000 at a show with Midnight Oil in Alice Springs.

Their music has been featured in the films Radiance, Yolngu Boy and Saturday Night, Sunday Morning.

Discography

Studio albums

Extended Plays

Singles

Awards and nominations

ARIA Music Awards
The ARIA Music Awards is an annual awards ceremony that recognises excellence, innovation, and achievement across all genres of Australian music. They commenced in 1987.

! 
|-
| rowspan="2"| 2000
| "Neva Mend"
| ARIA Award for Best Adult Alternative Album
| 
|
|-
| Bart Borghese – Nokturnl – "Neva Mend"
| ARIA Award for Best Video
| 
|
|-

Deadly Awards
The Deadly Awards, (commonly known simply as The Deadlys), was an annual celebration of Australian Aboriginal and Torres Strait Islander achievement in music, sport, entertainment and community. They ran from 1996 to 2013.
 (wins only)
! 
|-
| Deadly Awards 1998
| NoKTuRNL
| Band of The Year 
| 
| 
|-
| Deadly Awards 2000
| NoKTuRNL
| Band of The Year 
| 
| 
|-
| Deadly Awards 2003
| NoKTuRNL
| Band of The Year 
| 
| 
|-

References

External links
Official website (2003 archive)

Northern Territory musical groups
Indigenous Australian musical groups
Australian heavy metal musical groups
Musical groups established in 1996
Rap metal musical groups